Rubina is an Indian actress, known for her comic roles.

Biography
Born on 22 March 1984 in Chandigarh, India, Rubina started her acting career on TV in 2001. She made mark through her stage performances in theater, including performances in Prajit Nayak, Study through Theatre Project Gaz Foot Inch, Guffaien, Urubhangam, Nagmandal. She debuted in Bollywood Industry with Namastey London in 2007

She is also a voiceover and dubbing artist. She wrote the screenplay for Punjabi film Yaaran Da Katchup in 2014.

Filmography

Actor

References

External links
 

Living people
1984 births